Dick Adams may refer to:

 Dick Adams (politician) (born 1951), Australian politician
 Dick Adams (baseball) (1920–2016), American Major League Baseball player
 Dick Adams (Canadian football) (born 1948), Canadian football player

See also
 Rick Adams (disambiguation)
 Richard Adams (disambiguation)
 Dick (disambiguation)
 Adams (disambiguation)